Ambalindum is a pastoral lease that operates as a cattle station in the Alice Springs region of the Northern Territory.

The ephemeral Hale River runs through the property.

Gold was discovered in the area in 1887 with the first cattle and sheep stations settled in the early 1900s. Ambalindum was initially settled by George Cavanagh.

In 2017 the owners, Tim and Emily Edmunds, sold their Hale River Pastoral Company including the Ambalindum and Numery leases to a Canadian Pension Fund for over 50 million.

See also
List of ranches and stations

References

Pastoral leases in the Northern Territory
Stations (Australian agriculture)